The 1957 Florida Gators football team represented the University of Florida during the 1957 NCAA University Division football season. The season was Bob Woodruff's eighth as the head coach of the Florida Gators football team. Woodruff's 1957 Florida Gators finished their abbreviated season with an overall record of 6–2–1 and a Southeastern Conference (SEC) record of 4–2–1, tying for third place among the twelve SEC teams.

Before the season
The 1957 season was the last time the Gators played only nine games in a season. Ten games were scheduled, but the season opener against the UCLA Bruins was canceled when most of the Gators team members were suffering from a serious bout of influenza. The Gators were led by quarterback Jimmy Dunn, and two-way halfbacks Bernie Parrish and Jim Rountree.

Schedule

Roster
QB Jimmy Dunn, Jr.

Season summary

Wake Forest
Florida won a 27–0 home-opener victory over the Wake Forest Demon Deacons.

Kentucky
The second week of play was a 14–7 conference win over the Kentucky Wildcats.

Mississippi State
Florida lost at homecoming to Mississippi State 29–20.

LSU
The Gators upset Billy Cannon and his 10th-ranked LSU Tigers 22–14.

Auburn
The Gators were shut out 13–0 by coach Ralph Jordan's national champion Auburn Tigers. When the two teams met in Cliff Hare Stadium in Auburn, it was the first game between the rivals in which both teams were ranked in the top twenty of the AP Poll. Woodruff's Gators featured their usual strong defense, but the Tigers defense was even better.

Georgia
Florida beat the Georgia Bulldogs 22–0.

Vanderbilt
Parrish was named AP "Back of the Week" for his performance in the 14–7 win over Vanderbilt. This included rushing for 111 yards, scoring both touchdowns, kicking both extra points, catching an interception, and making seven tackles—including one to prevent the Commodores' tying score.

Georgia Tech
Georgia Tech and Florida fought to a scoreless tie.

Miami
Florida had a road win over the in-state rival Miami Hurricanes, 14–0 in Miami, Florida.

Postseason
At the end of the season, the Gators finished in the top twenty of the final AP Poll for only the second time in their history,'

References

Florida
Florida Gators football seasons
Florida Gators football